American recording artist and actress Janet Jackson has appeared in various films and television shows. She began her career as a child star in the sitcoms Good Times, Diff'rent Strokes, and Fame. Jackson then starred in her debut film Poetic Justice (1993), directed by John Singleton. She portrayed Justice, who copes with her mother's suicide and boyfriend's murder through writing poetry. It opened at number one at the box office and has been considered iconic within popular culture. Throughout the decade, Jackson was initially cast in leading roles in several films, including Jerry Maguire (1996), The Matrix (1999), Scream 3 (2000), and X-Men (2000), but was unable to proceed with filming due to scheduling conflicts while touring.

Jackson portrayed Professor Denise Gaines in her second film, The Nutty Professor II: The Klumps (2000), which grossed $175 million worldwide. She received positive reception for her acting and persuasion. Several years later, she performed multiple skits on Saturday Night Live and appeared on Will & Grace. Jackson played Dr. Patricia Agnew, a relationship psychiatrist, in her third film, Why Did I Get Married? (2007). It grossed nearly $60 million. She also starred in its sequel, Why Did I Get Married Too? (2010), exceeding $60 million in profits. She then co-starred in the drama For Colored Girls (2010). Following this, she entered a production deal with Lionsgate to develop several films.

Jackson's first three films have opened at number one, with her following two opening within the top three. She also has a minimum of three films to debut at number one on the DVD and Blu-ray charts, selling one to two million copies within their first week. Her film performances have garnered numerous accolades, which include MTV Movie Awards and Image Awards. Her film compositions have also received recognition, including Academy Award and Golden Globe nominations for "Best Original Song from a Motion Picture." Critics have considered Jackson among the few child stars to successfully transition into a credible actress. She is also thought to have one of the most notorious film careers by a musician. Throughout her career, she has also filmed advertisements for Pepsi, Jaguar, Japan Airlines, KDDI, and The Trevor Project, among others.

Background
Jackson began her career as a child star, performing a series of successful television roles before starring in feature films. Jackson stated, "I love acting—it was my first love. I had my first job at seven. I got a recording contract when I was 14, so I thought I was going to be an actress." Joan Morgan ultimately declared Jackson "a veteran thespian who also happened to sell more than 100 million records." DeMarco Williams placed Jackson among the few child stars who successfully transitioned into adult actors, along with Jodie Foster, Ron Howard, and Drew Barrymore. Ria Nevada observed her acting work to track Jackson’s evolution, "from the “girl next door” to sex-goddess, to the strong, powerful woman she is today." Of her standard acting rates, Phillip McCarthy declared her a "$3-million per-picture screen queen." Jackson has had three consecutive films open at number one, beginning with her debut role in Poetic Justice, and two additional films enter the top three. She also had a minimum of three consecutive films debut at number one on the DVD and Blu-ray charts, selling over one to two million copies within their first week.

Film
Jackson made her film debut in Poetic Justice, directed by John Singleton. Jackson's character, Justice, finds romance after her mother's suicide and boyfriend's murder, writing poetry to cope with her pain. Her love interest, Lucky, is played by Tupac Shakur, considered an "unlikely but effective pairing." Although advised to do a musical, Jackson accepted the role to further unveil an edgier and rebellious image, in contrast to her formerly innocent persona. It removed her from her comfort zone, opting for a "harder exterior and a rougher neck." It opened at number one, with its cult significance considered to have "dominated the 90′s." Diane E. Picard commended its plot, 
which "captures the sense of desperation felt by a young woman struggling with strong emotions and nowhere to turn." It was also declared "a surprising movie about coming of age in a time of violence and hatred." Several critics considered it a "classic" and iconic, in addition to one of the most notorious film debuts by a musician.

Jackson played Professor Denise Gaines in The Nutty Professor II: The Klumps, opposite Eddie Murphy. Brian Grazer stated, "she's a superstar musician who acts. Getting Janet is a huge coup for us because she doesn't have to do movies, but she wants to do this one." Murphy commented, "I've known for years that she's a good actress. [...] She's a superstar and a really talented woman... It was like 'Wow, I'm with a superstar on the set.'" It opened at number one and grossed $175 million worldwide, also being the biggest opening week of Murphy's career. Jackson received praise among critics for her portrayal. Melissa Marschheuser of The Sentinel stated "she plays the role perfectly", while Variety commended her "improbable persuasiveness."

Jackson played Dr. Patricia Agnew in her third film, Why Did I Get Married?. Patrick Huguenin described her role as "a picture-perfect (but emotionally scarred) romance psychologist who corrals her now-married college friends into an annual retreat." Variety considered Jackson's presence to ensure its success. It opened at number one, grossing nearly $60 million worldwide. She also starred in Why Did I Get Married Too?, reprising her role as a "demurely clothed, deeply sentient, highly respected psychologist." It opened at number two, grossing over $60 million. A third sequel, Why Did I Get Married Again?, would have Jackson play the love interest of Dwayne "The Rock" Johnson. Jackson then co-starred in the drama For Colored Girls, an adaption of the stage play For Colored Girls Who Have Considered Suicide / When the Rainbow Is Enuf. She portrayed Joanna, an abrasive fashion editor. It debuted at number three, with an intake of nearly $40 million.

In 2011, Jackson entered a production deal with Lionsgate, in collaboration with her company JDJ Entertainment. Michael Paseornek stated, "She is a powerful on-screen presence, with a vast audience, and we believe she will be an equally powerful presence behind the scenes." Jackson desires to pursue films with "a lot of energy," saying, "I love action films, I love Sci-Fi."

Television
Jackson was considered to initially become a "household name" with leading roles in several sitcoms, playing Penny Woods on Good Times and Charlene Duprey on Diff'rent Strokes. Jackson's character in the former addressed her as a victim of child abuse. Jackson then starred in the fourth season of Fame, playing the role of Cleo Hewitt. She also appeared in A New Kind of Family and The Love Boat. During her early acting roles, Jackson's fashion and hairstyle were considered influential to teenage girls, who were reported to emulate her appearance.

In April 2004, Jackson hosted and performed seven sketches on Saturday Night Live, several of which mocked her Super Bowl halftime show incident. Skits included "Cork Soakers" with Jimmy Fallon, "Brian Fellow's Safari Planet" with Tracy Morgan, and "Cheney and Condoleezza Rice" with Darrell Hammond. She also performed "All Nite (Don't Stop)" and "Strawberry Bounce". Tina Fey commented, "She was great. She's another one who's been acting since she was 10." Neil Cavuto considered her to turn the Super Bowl mishap "into a genuinely fun bit, actually several bits, on the comedy show," adding, "Janet did a lot to rehabilitate her image that night." Several months later, she appeared on Will & Grace in the episode "Back Up, Dancer". Jackson played herself, while Jack McFarland auditioned to become one of her dancers. Entertainment Weekly ranked her among the show's most memorable guest stars, stating, "she makes a fabulous entrance and departs with her dignity intact."

Other projects
Jackson has been approached for various films which she was unable to proceed with filming or declined. She was considered for the lead role in the musical Kiss of the Spider Woman. She was also approached for a remake of A Star Is Born, following the release of her album janet. Jackson was interested in portraying Dorothy Dandridge in a film biopic, in competition with Whitney Houston and various actresses. She was initially involved in its development, also emulating Dandridge in her "Twenty Foreplay" music video. Jackson was initially accepted for the role of Marcee Tidwell in the Tom Cruise film Jerry Maguire. A Jackson poster is briefly seen in the film in reference to this.

Jackson was offered a leading role in The Matrix alongside Keanu Reeves, but was unable to accept due to touring. She was initially cast as Trinity, the love interest of Reeve's character Neo, throughout the film and its sequels. Jackson was also cast as Storm in the X-Men franchise, and was shown the film's set by its directors shortly prior to filming. However, she later had to drop out due to scheduling conflicts while touring, with the role given to Halle Berry. Jackson also declined lead roles in the horror film Scream 3 and comedy Head of State due to scheduling conflicts. She was also originally requested to provide singing vocals for Catherine Zeta-Jones in the musical comedy, Chicago.

Jackson was announced to play Lena Horne in a two-hour television biopic for ABC. It was to be directed by Neil Meron and Craig Zadan, with Jackson serving as its executive producer. However, she was forced to resign following her Super Bowl halftime show controversy, in addition to Horne refusing her participation after the incident. An ABC executive stated, "It’s sad this had to happen. It was a perfect match." Jackson commented, "I just wish she would have taken a little more time to think about it. I'm sure she faced adversity in her career at some point as well."

In August 2004, director Betty Thomas cast Jackson to star in a remake of Valley of the Dolls, although the film never came to fruition. Jackson was then approached to appear in the Indian musical Bombay Dreams, but turned down the part. She was also considered for the role of Juliet in a potential adaption of Romeo and Juliet produced by Eddie Murphy, who would play Romeo's father. The following year, Jackson was initially cast as the White Witch in a planned Hollywood adaption of The Lion, the Witch and the Wardrobe. Tyler Perry also sought her for Madea's Family Reunion, though she rejected the part.

Lee Daniels cast Jackson to star in Tennessee and required her to gain weight for the role, leading to intense media scrutiny. However, she dropped out shortly before it received proper funding to promote her album 20 Y.O., with the part then given to Mariah Carey. In promotion for her then-upcoming Rock Witchu Tour, Jackson developed a potential reality series for MTV, mending her relationship with the network after being blacklisted from various music channels and radio stations for several years, due to fines regarding her Super Bowl halftime show incident. Jackson would mentor aspiring performers in search of a prodigy, taking place in various locations rather than a studio. It was to be produced by Jackson, Kenneth Crear, and Dave Broome, but was never released. In 2012, she declined judging positions on American Idol and The X Factor. Jackson was also announced to executive produce the documentary Truth, following the lives of several transgender people.

Influence in film

Jackson has been considered a primary example of a musician maintaining a credible acting career, setting a template for artists such as Jennifer Lopez. Dan Shanoff stated, "Before J-Lo even thought about being a singing-dancing-acting triple-threat... [Janet] was reinventing music videos, putting on a sick stage show and starring in both "Good Times" and "Diff'rent Strokes." MTV News observed her to inspire "a slew of singers" with her forays into film. Ashley Roberts stated, "I always kind of went to the artists who, like Janet Jackson, was an artist, but would go off and do film," while Kat Graham commented, "looking up to artists like Janet Jackson... I just don’t know why you can’t do it both."

Jackson has inspired performances by a number of actors, including Brit Marling, Olivia Wilde, Kate Hudson in Something Borrowed, and Elizabeth Mathis in Tron: Legacy, who stated, "I got the part. So I owe it all to Janet." Tom Hanks praised the usage of Jackson's choreography within films. Jackson brought director Dominic Sena to prominence, leading him to direct films starring Brad Pitt and Angelina Jolie. Jessica Alba cited her as the inspiration for her role in Honey, saying, "I grew up falling in love with Janet Jackson videos... And I wanted to be part of that." Jenna Dewan credits dancing with Jackson as the platform to star in Step Up. She also influenced actors Michael K. Williams and Carmen Electra. Her choreography has also been incorporated in numerous Bollywood films.

Jackson's debut in Poetic Justice has inspired several trends. PopMatters cited its spoken poetry theme to start "the spoken word explosion," influencing films such as Love Jones and Slam!. The Fader considered Jackson's image as Justice iconic, declaring it "one hell of a defining, iconoclastic moment that sticks in our brains and eventually disseminated through-and-through society." Her box braids in the film have become known as "Janet Jackson Braids," setting fashion trends. An anecdote stated, "celebrities continue to embrace Janet’s look and continue to evoke the memory of John Singleton's classic character and film." Artists such as Beyoncé and Solange Knowles were observed to emulate Jackson's braids. Nylon considered it the film's most iconic feature, comparing Jennifer Lawrence's "side-winding French plait" in The Hunger Games to the style.

Filmography

Films

Television

Commercials and advertisements

References

Actress filmographies
Filmography
American filmographies